Chugan or Chowgan may refer to:
 Chowgan, Kermanshah
 Chowgan, Khomeyn, Markazi Province
 Chowgan, Komijan, Markazi Province
 Chugan, South Khorasan
 Chowgan (Kishtwar), a large ground in Jammu and Kashmir, India.